The Magical Music Box, more commonly known as The Music Box was a British children's magazine. It ran from 1994 to 1996 in a series of 52 fortnightly serialisations. The aim of the magazine was to introduce children into classical music and to popularise this form of music among the younger generations.

The stories followed the fictional adventures of two siblings, Sarah and Jamie who find a magical music box through which they are able to enter other worlds, most commonly as spectators. The stories were generally related to other children's tales or fables, including issue 38 (King Arthur & The Knights of the Round Table), issue 2 (Peer Gynt, issue 11 (Sinbad the Sailor), and issue 27 (The Imperial Robes).

The dramatisations were produced by IRDP, Independent Radio Drama Productions on request of Marshall Cavendish Partworks Ltd

Features
The magazine cost £3.99 (with a tape) or £4.99 (with a CD) per issue.

 A different fortnightly story involving the siblings Sarah and Jamie
 A CD or tape with each issue
 The story in spoken word with an accompaniment of classical music
 The classical music on its own
 History behind the stories and the music
 Facts about the relevant composer and instruments
The formula for the magazine was simple. It followed the adventures of Jamie and Sarah, siblings who seemed to be magnets for danger. The stories had no sense of realism and were pure fantasy. The children seemed to be running around having adventures with no money, food or supervision. It is a pure fantasy which excited the youths imagination at the time. The music was used to construct the narrative through the adventurers and to the conclusions. That is why the magazine came with a tape or CD so you could listen to the story and the music. The magazine also had a strong educational element after each story. The narrator introduced the learner to each part of the music that had been played, and explained which instruments were used.

Issues

Awards 
The magazine won a Gold Medal and a Grand Award Trophy for Entertainment Programming at the International Radio Festival 1994 held in New York. These were for the drama in issue four, The Wizard's Spell.

References

External links 

 Marshall Cavendish Magazine Catalogue
 IRDP & The Music Box
 The New York Radio Programming Festival Online
 Copies of CDs, tapes and books can be found at PartWorks 
 Audio downloads and scans of the magazines can be found at 

1993 establishments in the United Kingdom
Music magazines published in the United Kingdom
Classical music magazines
Defunct magazines published in the United Kingdom
Magazines established in 1993
Magazines disestablished in 1997
Children's magazines published in the United Kingdom